Kangemi is a slum in Kenya located, like many other slums in Nairobi, on the outskirts of the city.  It is bordered on the north by the middle-class neighbourhoods of Loresho and Kibagare and Westlands on its west.  Its southern border connects with Kawangware, another large slum and its eastern border connects to Mountain View, another middle class enclave.  It is on the road connecting Nairobi with Naivasha. Kangemi likely has more than 100,000 residents.  While it is a multi-ethnic slum, the largest group of residents consists of the Luhya tribe.

Kangemi is located in a small valley. The slum has no sewerage. About 20,000 persons belong to a Catholic parish based in Kangemi. The St. Joseph Catholic Parish is one of the places Pope Francis visited during his visit to Africa between 26 and 30 November 2015, of which Kenya was his first stopover. He visited Kangemi on 27 November 2015. He met with the community and gave an address. Kangemi High School exists in Kangemi.

See also
Dagoretti
Githurai
Huruma
Kawangware
Kiambiu
Kibera
Korogocho
Mathare
Muirigo
Mukuru kwa Njenga
Uthiru

References

Suburbs of Nairobi
Slums in Kenya
Squatting in Kenya